John Greene was a Union Navy sailor in the American Civil War and a recipient of the U.S. military's highest decoration, the Medal of Honor, for his actions at the Battle of Forts Jackson and St. Philip.

Biography
At the Battle of Forts Jackson and St. Philip near New Orleans on April 24, 1862, Varuna was rammed twice by the Confederate steamer  (formerly known as the Charles Morgan) and eventually sunk. Greene acted as a gun captain and "remained steadfast at his gun throughout the thickest of the fight and was instrumental in inflicting damage on the enemy". For this action, he was awarded the Medal of Honor a year later, on April 3, 1863.

Greene's official Medal of Honor citation reads:
Captain of a gun on board the U.S.S. Varuna during the attacks on Forts Jackson and St. Philip, and while under fire and ramming by the rebel ship Morgan, 24 April 1862. During this action at extremely close range while his ship was under furious fire and twice rammed by the rebel ship Morgan, Greene remained steadfast at his gun throughout the thickest of the fight and was instrumental in inflicting damage on the enemy until the Varuna, badly damaged and forced to beach, was finally sunk.

See also

List of American Civil War Medal of Honor recipients: G–L

References

Year of birth unknown
Year of death unknown
People of New York (state) in the American Civil War
Union Navy sailors
United States Navy Medal of Honor recipients
American Civil War recipients of the Medal of Honor